The National Conscription Agency (NCA) is the agency of the Ministry of the Interior of the Republic of China (Taiwan) in charge of national conscription administration.

History
The agency was established in 2002.

Organizational structure
 Draft Division
 Selection and Training Division
 Administrative Division
 Interests Division
 Recruit Division
 Secretary Office
 Personnel Office
 Accounting Office
 Anti-Corruption Office

See also
 Ministry of the Interior (Taiwan)

References

External links

 

2002 establishments in Taiwan
Executive Yuan
Military of the Republic of China
Military units and formations established in 2002
Taiwan